Events in the year 1991 in Germany.

Incumbents
President - Richard von Weizsäcker
Chancellor – Helmut Kohl

Events
 January 18 - The Fourth Kohl cabinet led by Helmut Kohl was sworn in.
 Februara 15-26 - 41st Berlin International Film Festival
 March 21: Germany in the Eurovision Song Contest 1991
 June 17: The Treaty of Good Neighbourship is signed by Germany and Poland
 June 20: The capital decision is made over which city will be the German capital city.
 August: Launch of the MK3 Volkswagen Golf, which replaces the MK2 model which was in production for eight years. A saloon version to replace the Jetta is due early next year.
 September 17 - 23: Hoyerswerda riots
 December: The Volkswagen Golf is voted European Car of the Year, the first Volkswagen to receive this accolade.
 German company Krupp bought Hoesch AG.

Elections

 Rhineland-Palatinate state election

Sport

 1990–91 Bundesliga
 1990–91 2. Bundesliga
 1990–91 ice hockey Bundesliga season
 1991 Men's Hockey Champions Trophy
 1991 Women's Hockey Champions Trophy
 1991 ATP German Open
 1991 BMW Open
 1991 German Grand Prix
 1991 German motorcycle Grand Prix
 1991 DTM season

Music

Births

4 January - Pascal Bodmer, German ski jumper
19 January - Corinna Harrer, German runner
27 January - Christian Bickel, German footballer
28 January - Kai Kazmirek, German athlete
5 February - Henriette Confurius, German actress
9 February - Almuth Schult, German footballer
21 February - Philip Heintz, German swimmer
1 May - Levina, German singer
10 May - Giorgos Machlelis, Greek international footballer
15 May - Jennifer Hof, German fashion model
23 May - Lena Meyer-Landrut, German singer-songwriter
26 May - Marie-Sophie Hindermann, German artistic gymnast
24 June - Robin Erewa, German athlete
25 June - Anna Zaja, German tennis player
14 July - Cihan Özkara, German-Turkish-Azerbaijani footballer
20 September - Thomas Röhler, German athlete
28 September - Pamela Dutkiewicz, German athlete
5 December - Carolin Schäfer, German athlete
16 December - Andreas Hofmann, German athlete
21 December - Peter Baumgartner, ice hockey player
27 December - Jimi Blue Ochsenknecht, German actor

Deaths

14 January - Heli Finkenzeller, German actress (born 1911)
13 February - Arno Breker, German architect and sculptor (born 1900)
13 March - Josef Manger, German heavy weight lifter (born 1913)
16 March - Trude Herr, singer (born 1927)
1 April - Detlev Karsten Rohwedder, German politician (born 1932)
8 April - Tilo von Berlepsch, German actor (born 1913)
22 April - Karl Klasen, German banker (born 1909)
7 May - Wolfgang Reichmann, German actress (born 1932)
8 June - Heidi Brühl, German actress (born 1942)
21 June - Klaus Schwarzkopf, German actor (born 1922)
21 June - Karl Krolow, German poet (born 1915)
23 June — Michael Pfleghar, German film director and screenwriter (born 1933)
24 June - Franz Hengsbach, German cardinal of Roman Catholic Church (born 1910)
28 June - Hans Nüsslein, German tennis player (born 1910)
1 July - Joachim Kroll, serial killer (born 1933)
9 August - Richard Löwenthal, German author and journalist (born 1908)
16 August - Johannes Wiese, German pilot during World War II, a fighter ace (born 1915)
21 August - Wolfgang Hildesheimer, German writer (born 1916)
3 September - Falk Harnack, German film director and screenwriter (born 1913)
27 September - Karl-Heinz Köpcke, German news speaker (born 1922)
4 October - Heinrich Hellwege, German politician (born 1908)
9 October - Roy Black, German actor and singer (born 1943)
23 November - Klaus Kinski, German actor (born 1926)
12 December - Gustav Schäfer, German rower (born 1906)
23 December - Heinrich Wöhlk, German optometrist (born 1913)
24 December - Alfons Goppel, German politician (born 1905)
25 December - Curt Bois, actor (born 1901)

See also
1991 in German television

References

 
Years of the 20th century in Germany
1990s in Germany
Germany
Germany